Stuart Hall (born 18 October 1984 in Chelmsford) is a British racing driver. He is the 2013 GTEAM World Endurance Champion and has competed at the 24 Hours of Le Mans for teams including Aston Martin Racing.

Career

Single-seaters
After winning the T Cars championship in 2000, Hall moved into single-seaters. In 2002 he finished ninth in the British Formula Ford Championship, before coming fourth in that year's Winter Series, where he won two of the four races. The following year he only started 12 of the 20 races in the series, concentrating instead on his A level studies. After debuting in Formula Renault in the 2003 UK Winter Series, he raced full-time in Formula Renault UK in 2004. Driving for Fortec Motorsport, he finished seventh overall with three podium finishes. He then won the Winter Series, winning one of the four races. He remained in Formula Renault UK in 2005, but slipped to eighth overall although he had increased his podium tally to five.

2006 saw Hall move up to British Formula Three. He raced the first five race weekends with Fortec, before missing the sixth round at Spa-Francorchamps and returning with T-Sport. He finished the year 13th in the standings.

Sportscars
Hall switched to sportscars in 2007, contesting the Le Mans Series in Rollcentre Racing's Pescarolo-Judd LMP1, though he raced the season finale in Brazil with the Creation Autosportif team. He finished fifth in the drivers' standings, and also finished fourth at the 24 Hours of Le Mans with Rollcentre. He drove for Creation in 2008, finishing seventh in the Le Mans Series and 11th at Le Mans. He joined Aston Martin Racing in 2009, contesting the 24 Hours, from which his car retired, and the final two rounds of the Le Mans Series.

Hall made just a few British GT appearances in 2010–11, before signing to race the new Pescarolo 03 at the 2012 24 Hours of Le Mans. In 2013, Hall drove a Vantage V8 GTE for Aston Martin Racing in the LMGTE Am class of the FIA World Endurance Championship. He won it together with Jamie Campbell-Walter in 2013 but spent two further seasons in that car. 

In 2015 Hall was also runner up in the GTC class of the European Le Mans Series with AF Course in a Ferrari 458 GT3.

Between 2016 and 2018 Hall drove a Mercedes AMG GT GT3 for ROFGO Racing earning victory in the Silverstone 12hours during that period. 

Hall spent three seasons in the Blancpain Endurance Series between 2019 and 2021 with GPX Racing and Team WRT respectively.

In 2022 Hall won the GT4 Class of the British Endurance Championship with MKH Racing. A team that he lends his name too. 

Historic Racing  

Hall regularly competes in Historic Racing. Driving the famous cars from the ROFGO Collection and GPX Historic Collection.  

Hall has won the Monaco Historic Grand Prix 3 times. Once in 2016 in a McLaren M19 and twice in 2022 in a McLaren M19 and M23. He has also won numerous Historic events around the world including venues in Dubai, the USA and Europe.

Racing record

24 Hours of Le Mans results

Complete FIA World Endurance Championship results

Britcar 24 Hour results

References

External links
 

1984 births
Living people
Sportspeople from Chelmsford
English racing drivers
Formula Ford drivers
British Formula Renault 2.0 drivers
Formula Renault Eurocup drivers
British Formula Three Championship drivers
European Le Mans Series drivers
24 Hours of Le Mans drivers
American Le Mans Series drivers
British GT Championship drivers
FIA World Endurance Championship drivers
Blancpain Endurance Series drivers
24 Hours of Spa drivers
Britcar drivers
Britcar 24-hour drivers
24H Series drivers
Aston Martin Racing drivers
T-Sport drivers
Charouz Racing System drivers
Pescarolo Sport drivers
Audi Sport drivers
W Racing Team drivers
Comtec Racing drivers
Fortec Motorsport drivers
AF Corse drivers
GT4 European Series drivers